Ahypophyllus is a genus of flies in the family Dolichopodidae. It currently contains only one species, Ahypophyllus sinensis, known only from China.

The generic name is derived from the negative prefix "a" and the generic name Hypophyllus.

References 

Dolichopodidae genera
Dolichopodinae
Diptera of Asia
Monotypic Diptera genera